Philadelphus pekinensis (mock orange, 太平花 tai ping hua) is a species of deciduous shrub,  high, endemic to northern and western China and Korea, with fragrant flowers up to 1" across in small clusters.

Synonyms
Philadelphus coronarius var. pekinensis Maxim.
Philadelphus pekinensis f. lanceolatus S.Y. Hu
Philadelphus pekinensis var. pekinensis
Philadelphus rubricaulis Carrière

References

Missouri Botanical Garden entry

Endemic flora of China
Flora of Korea
pekinensis